Saleem Sherwani (Urdu: ﺳﻠﯿﻢ ﺷﻴﺮوﺍﻧﻰ; born 4 January 1951) is a former field hockey goalkeeper from Pakistan Men's National Hockey Team. He won the silver medal at the 1972 Summer Olympics in Munich, Germany and bronze medal in 1976 Summer Olympics in Montreal, Quebec, Canada.

His active years were from 1969 to 1979. He was capped 91 times during his career.

See also
 Pakistan Hockey Federation

References

External links
 

1951 births
Living people
Pakistani male field hockey players
Olympic field hockey players of Pakistan
Olympic silver medalists for Pakistan
Olympic bronze medalists for Pakistan
Olympic medalists in field hockey
Medalists at the 1972 Summer Olympics
Medalists at the 1976 Summer Olympics
Field hockey players at the 1972 Summer Olympics
Field hockey players at the 1976 Summer Olympics
Asian Games medalists in field hockey
Field hockey players at the 1970 Asian Games
Field hockey players at the 1974 Asian Games
Field hockey players at the 1978 Asian Games
Place of birth missing (living people)
Asian Games gold medalists for Pakistan
Medalists at the 1970 Asian Games
Medalists at the 1974 Asian Games
Medalists at the 1978 Asian Games
1978 Men's Hockey World Cup players